This is a list of awards and nominations received by Burna Boy, a Nigerian singer and songwriter.

References 

Burna Boy